W. Eugene Smith Memorial Fund is an organisation established to encourage and support individuals who are active in the field of photography for humanitarian purposes. It gives out the W. Eugene Smith Grant and Howard Chapnick Grant.

Since 1979 the fund has worked to seek out independent voices who work and create outside the boundaries of modern publishing and mass media, following the legacy of W. Eugene Smith. The American photojournalist, working between 1936 and 1978, was committed to the documentation of human condition and suffering. He travelled searching to portray and capture people's behaviour in emotional distress.

For more than thirty years the fund has recognized photographers who explore matters of global importance and address them with integrity and courage.

W. Eugene Smith Grant
Every year a grant is given to a photographer with an innovative and intriguing sight of humans dealing with social, economical, political or environmental issues.

Recipients of W. Eugene Smith Grant

W. Eugene Smith Fellowship
With the award of the Grant, a $5000 (US) Fellowship is also shared between one or more finalists deemed worthy of special recognition.

Recipients of W. Eugene Smith Fellowship
2010: Kosuke Okahara for Ibasyo: self-injury among young Japanese girls
2011: Massimo Berutti for Dusty path
2014: Moises Saman for Discordia: The Arab Spring
2015: Jointly awarded to Mary F. Calvert (for The Battle Within: Sexual Violence in America’s Military) and Marcus Bleasdale (for The Unravelling: Central African Republic).
2016: Oscar B. Castillo
2017: Edmund Clark and Alex Majoli
2018: Sarah Blesener
2019: Siân Davey
2022: Mary F. Calvert

Howard Chapnick Grant
In 1996 a new award was added, the Howard Chapnick Grant, to encourage leadership in fields that are complementary to photojournalism, such as editing research or education and management. The grant was established to honor the memory of Howard Chapnick, former president of Black Star picture agency and writer of The Truth Needs No Ally: Inside Photojournalism. The $5000 (US) grant funds a variety of projects which might include a program of further education, research, a special long-term sabbatical project, or an internship to work with a noteworthy group or individual.

Recipients of Howard Chapnick Grant

References

External links

Memorial funds
Photojournalism awards
Photography awards